Rhododendron asterochnoum (汶川星毛杜鹃) is a rhododendron species native to western Sichuan, China, where it grows at altitudes of . This small tree reaches  in height, with leathery leaves that are broadly oblanceolate, rarely oblong-elliptic, and 17–26 × 3–9 cm in size. The flowers are pale pink or white.

Lower taxa
Two variants are recognized:

Rhododendron asterochnoum var. asterochnoum
Rhododendron asterochnoum var. brevipedicellatum W.K.Hu

References

Sources
 Diels, Repert. Spec. Nov. Regni Veg. 17: 196. 1921.
 Plants of the World Online

asterochnoum